Fool's Day is an annual custom on 1 April consisting of practical jokes and hoaxes.

Fool's Day may also refer to:
 "Fool's Day" (song), a song by English rock band Blur
 "Fool's Day", a song by Lloyd Clarke

See also
 April Fool's Day (disambiguation)